Zephaniah Swift Moore (November 20, 1770 – June 29, 1823) was an American Congregational clergyman and educator. He taught at Dartmouth College during the early 1810s and had a house built in Hanover, New Hampshire, that now serves as Dartmouth's Blunt Alumni Center.  He served as the President of Williams College between 1815 and 1821 and the first President of Amherst College between 1821 and 1823. He is most famous for leaving Williams in order to found Amherst, taking some of the faculty and 15 students with him. The rumor that Williams College library books were also taken to Amherst College was declared false in 1995 by Williams College President Harry C. Payne.

Moore died two years after Amherst was founded, and was succeeded by Heman Humphrey, a trustee of Williams College. Moore's departure from Williams College established the foundation for the intense Williams–Amherst rivalry that persists to the present. To this day, he is regarded with a measure of derision on the Williams campus.

Cyrus Pitt Grosvenor wrote to him in 1823.

References

1770 births
1823 deaths
Presidents of Williams College
Dartmouth College alumni
Dartmouth College faculty
Presidents of Amherst College